Cramalt Craig is a hill in the Manor Hills range, part of the Southern Uplands of Scotland. It is climbed almost solely from its southern sides at the Megget Stane or Cramalt Farm, taking in the neighbouring hills.

Subsidiary SMC Summits

References

Mountains and hills of the Southern Uplands
Donald mountains
Mountains and hills of the Scottish Borders